The Clubhaus Seniors Classic was a men's senior (over 50) professional golf tournament on the European Seniors Tour, held at the Benton Hall Golf & Country Club in Witham, Essex, England. It was held just once, in September 1997, and was won by Tommy Horton who finished two shots ahead of David Jones after a final found 64. Total prize money was £75,000 with the winner receiving £12,450.

Winners

References

External links
Coverage on the European Senior Tour's official site

Former European Senior Tour events
Golf tournaments in England